The Greatest Hits Live at Wembley Arena is a compilation DVD by Atomic Kitten containing the group's concert at Wembley Arena, Wembley Park, which was given at 29 February 2004 and directed by Mike Cockayne. The DVD also combined with a selection of the Greatest Hits music videos.

A similar DVD was released a year later for the Asian market which included a B-sides and remix album as well entitled Access All Areas: Remixed & B-Side, with a slightly different track listing.

Track listing

Music videos:

External links
 Official site

Atomic Kitten video albums
2004 video albums
2004 live albums
Live video albums